Tennessee & Other Stories... is the debut album from Hans Chew.  It was initially released in vinyl format only as a 500 copy limited edition gatefold LP by Three Lobed Recordings in 2010.  Uncut placed the album at number 21 on their list of the "Top 50 Albums of 2010", and the number 3 spot on their "20 Best Americana Albums of the Year".  The album also garnered Hans Chew a nomination for the 2011 Uncut Music Award.

Track listing

External links
 Official Website
 Facebook

References

2010 debut albums